A night game is a game played under artificial lights.

Night Game may also refer to:

Night Game (film), a 1989 baseball mystery film
Night Game (novel), a paranormal romance novel by Christine Feehan
The Night Game, an American rock band
Night Game, a 1992 mystery novel by Alison Gordon
NightSky, a video game by Nicklas Nygren previously known as Night Game

See also
Night Games (disambiguation)